The 1997–98 Scottish Challenge Cup was the eighth season of the competition, competed for by the 30 member clubs of the Scottish Football League. The defending champions were Stranraer, who defeated St Johnstone 1–0 in the 1996 final.

The final was played on 2 November 1997, between Falkirk and Queen of the South at Fir Park in Motherwell. Falkirk won 1–0, to win the tournament for the second time after winning the tournament in 1993.

Schedule

First round 
Brechin City and Ross County received random byes into the second round.

Source: Soccerbase

Second round 

Source: Soccerbase

Quarter-finals

Semi-finals

Final

Notes 
A. The 1998–99 tournament was suspended due to lack of sponsorship

References

External links 
 Scottish Football League Scottish Challenge Cup on Scottish Football League website
 ESPN Soccernet  Scottish League Challenge Cup homepage on ESPN Soccernet
 BBC Sport – Scottish Cups Challenge Cup on BBC Sport

Scottish Challenge Cup seasons
Challenge Cup
Scottish Challenge Cup